The Shanghai University of Political Science and Law (SHUPL) is a public university in Shanghai, China,

Founded in 1984,  SHUPL is situated in the  Sheshan Mountain scenic area.  The university has 12 academic schools and other teaching departments include the Graduate School, Department of Physical Education, Network and Modern Education Technology Center, and Vocational Training Center. SHUPL now offers 3 master's degree programs, 25 undergraduate programs and 7 higher vocational degree programs.

There are more than 10,600 full-time students in the university. Forty percent of its faculty members are above associate professor level and over 84% of its faculty members are masters or even doctors. SHUPL has established exchange relations with institutions in the United States, France, Japan and Hong Kong.

SHUPL is one of the few higher education institutions in China specializing in legal education. I

the central of politics and law police enroll system reform pilot project to develop colleges and universities, Chinese government scholarship students receive in China universities, the "silk road" government scholarship students training colleges, humanity project training colleges and universities of China and the United States, "study in China" overseas preparatory education alliance members, the national university of political science and law, alliance member, "area", a think-tank, alliance director unit, All the way to be included in the supreme people's court area 'judicial research base, Shanghai international judicial cooperation organization communication training cooperation base characteristics of national defense education, the ministry of education school, Shanghai outstanding legal talent training base, Shanghai foreign outstanding legal talent training base, the outstanding talent education training plan of dissemination of news, Shanghai university demonstration school of Marxism construction unit, Shanghai new doctorate awarded the project, the construction unit, Shanghai university education education teaching reform pilot "cultivate college". [1] [2] [3]

Its predecessor was Shanghai executive leadership academy of political science and law, which was founded in 1984. In September 2004, with the approval of the Shanghai municipal people's government, Shanghai institute of political science and law was established on the basis of the former law school of Shanghai university and Shanghai administrative cadre institute for political science and law. [1]

In 2015, the university, together with tongji university, Shanghai institute of international studies, Shanghai academy of social sciences and other universities and research institutes, established the first One Belt And One Road collaborative innovation center on security issues in China, and was identified as the One Belt And One Road judicial research base of the Supreme People's Court. In the same year, the school established a comprehensive relationship of strategic cooperation and co-construction with qingpu district people's government, hongkou district people's procuratorate and putuo district people's court. By July 20, 2019, the school covers an area of more than 1,000 mu. It has 16 secondary departments; There are 3 first-level master's programs, 4 professional master's programs, and more than 30 undergraduate programs. There are more than 700 faculty members; More than 11,000 full-time students; There are 35 specialized laboratories and training rooms, and nearly 200 off-campus practice bases for college students

The Shanghai University of Political Science and Law obtained more than 40 research projects at or above the provincial or ministerial level, 8 national projects, and more than 20 provincial or ministerial projects. [16] [61]

Undergraduate Programs (4 years) 

 Civil and Commercial Law 
 Economic Law 
 Environmental Law 
 Financial Law 
 International Economic Law
 Criminal Justice 
 International Politics 
 Politics and Administration 
 Sociology 
 Social Work 
 Application Psychology 
 International Economy and Trade 
 Economics 
 Business Administration 
 Economics and Finance  
 Journalism 
 Radio and Television 
 Chinese Language and Literature

External links 
University homepage
Shanghai University of Political Science and Law (SHUPL)

Universities and colleges in Shanghai
Educational institutions established in 1984
Law schools in China
1984 establishments in China
Political science in China
Political science education